Beldubi is a census town in Panchla CD Block of Howrah Sadar subdivision in Howrah district in the state of West Bengal, India.

Geography
Beldubi is located at

Demographics
As per 2011 Census of India Beldubi had a total population of 10,871 of which 5,568 (51%) were males and 5,303 (49%) were females. Population below 6 years was 1,360. The total number of literates in Beldubi was 7,650 (80.43% of the population over 6 years).

 India census, Beldubi had a population of 8983. Males constitute 50% of the population and females 50%. Beldubi has an average literacy rate of 62%, higher than the national average of 59.5%; with 56% of the males and 44% of females literate. 14% of the population is under 6 years of age.

References

Cities and towns in Howrah district